Sir Richard Butler, 7th Baronet (14 July 1761 – 16 January 1817) was an Anglo-Irish politician.

He was the eldest son of Sir Thomas Butler, 6th Baronet and his wife Dorothea Bayly, daughter of Very Rev. Edward Bayly, Archdeacon of Dublin. In 1772, he succeeded his father as baronet. He was appointed High Sheriff of Carlow for 1784.

Butler sat for Carlow County in the Irish House of Commons from 1783 until 1790 and again from 1796 until the Act of Union in 1801. Subsequently he represented Carlow County in the Parliament of the United Kingdom until the 1802 general election.

On 23 August 1782, Butler married Sarah Maria Newenham, only daughter of Thomas Worth Newenham. They had at least a daughter and three sons. His grandson, William C. Butler (1844–1914) played football for England against a Scottish XI in two unofficial internationals in 1870 and 1871.

Butler died, aged 55 and was succeeded by his eldest son Thomas.

References

1761 births
1817 deaths
19th-century Irish people
Irish MPs 1783–1790
Irish MPs 1790–1797
Irish MPs 1798–1800
Members of the Parliament of Ireland (pre-1801) for County Carlow constituencies
Politicians from County Carlow
High Sheriffs of Carlow
Richard
Butler baronets, of Cloughgrenan
Members of the Parliament of the United Kingdom for County Carlow constituencies (1801–1922)
UK MPs 1801–1802